Kelvin Leslie Clarke (born 16 July 1957) is an English former footballer who played in the Football League as a defender for Walsall. Clarke was born in Willenhall, the fourth of five brothers (Frank, Allan, Derek and Wayne) who all went on to play League football. He was signed by Walsall as an apprentice, and turned professional in July 1975. He made nine league appearances, without scoring, before an ankle injury forced his retirement in 1978.

References 

1957 births
Living people
People from Willenhall
English footballers
Association football defenders
Walsall F.C. players
English Football League players